Beckville is an unincorporated community in Greenleaf Township, Meeker County, Minnesota, United States, located near Litchfield.  The community is located along 600th Avenue near 205th Street.

External links

References

Unincorporated communities in Minnesota
Unincorporated communities in Meeker County, Minnesota